Tiarno may refer to 2 Italian villages of the province of Trento.

Tiarno di Sopra, in the municipality of Ledro
Tiarno di Sotto, in the municipality of Ledro